In Love and War is a Hallmark Hall of Fame TV movie, directed by John Kent Harrison. It is based on the 1971 book Love and War in the Apennines by Eric Newby. It was filmed in Italy and stars Callum Blue and Barbora Bobuľová. The presentation aired on CBS on November 18, 2001.

Plot 

Eric Newby is an English soldier in 1943, captured by the Germans and imprisoned in a former mansion in Italy. The mansion is beautiful, Prisoners are well fed and receive Red Cross packages regularly. While Wanda and her Italian girl friends bicycle past the mansion, Eric spots her, and she returns his glances. In one of the packages, Eric claims an Italian language book. Wanda finds her way into the prisoner section as an Italian language mentor. Of course, Erik becomes her student.  Sometime later, Eric and others escape, and Wanda finds him. She leads him north, thinking he will escape to Switzerland. They find their way to an Italian farm. Eric is taken in by the family, made to look like an Italian (vs. Englishman), and remains on the farm as a farm worker. 
   But the Nazi soldiers are searching for the escaped prisoners. The local people build a secret small residence in the surrounding hills to hide Eric. The Nazi soldiers arrive with tracking dogs and discover Eric’s hideout. Eric and Wanda are hiding in the nearby rocks.  
   Not wanting Wanda to get into trouble, Eric presents himself to the German soldiers, allowing Wanda to remain hidden. Eric is returned to a prison. 2 years later, when the war is declared over, Eric returns to Wanda’s town. As he exits the bus, he is unsure where to go. Wanda spots him at the bus stop and they run into each other’s arms.

Cast 
Callum Blue as Eric Newby
Barbora Bobuľová as Wanda
Roberto Nobile as Wanda's Father
Madlena Nedeva as Wanda's Mother
Oreste Rotundo as the Doctor
Peter Bowles as Melville
Nick Reding as James 
John Warnaby as Feathers 
Toby Jones as Bolo 
Robert Weatherby as Butler 
Nicholas Gallagher as Duffy
Mark Whiteley as Bob 
Maurizio Donadoni as Vincenzo 
Rosa Pianeta as Rosa 
Bianca Nappi as Dolores 
Emanuela Macchniz as Bianca 
Silvia De Santis as  Valeria
Giorgio Cantarini as Slavko 
Nicola Pannelli as Maurizio 
Marco Quaglia as Giuseppe 
Massimo Sarchielli as Merily 
Orazio Stracuzzi as Baruffa 
Rosa Di Brigida as Mrs. Baruffa 
Franco Ravera as Osvaldo

References

External links
 

2000s war drama films
2001 television films
2001 films
American war drama films
2000s English-language films
Films shot in Italy
Hallmark Hall of Fame episodes
Films based on British novels
Films directed by John Kent Harrison
American drama television films
2000s American films